Guangdong Hongyuan may refer to:
Guangdong Winnerway Group
Guangdong Southern Tigers, the basketball club owned by Guangdong Winnerway Group
Guangdong Winnerway F.C., the defunct football club owned by Guangdong Winnerway Group.